Jayesh Sheth is an Indian fashion photographer. Sheth is credited with the shooting of first portfolio of Akshay Kumar. Rani Mukherjee, Mamta Kulkarni and Smriti Irani.

Sheth completed his diploma from Sir J. J. School of Art, Mumbai. His photography career started in 1978. In 2015, Sheth directed his debut film Roll Sound Camera Action which premiered at the Montreal World Film Festival, 2015.

References

External links 

Living people
Indian fashion photographers
Year of birth missing (living people)

 Jayesh Sheth Advisory Council Member of Ekta Kapoor ICE Institute